Kunbao Sport Continental Cycling Team is a UCI Continental team founded in 2019 that is based in Inner Mongolia, China.

Team roster

References

External links

UCI Continental Teams (Asia)
Cycling teams based in China
Cycling teams established in 2019